ACoconut Football Club  is a football club located in Brokopondo, Suriname. The club currently competes in the SVB Eerste Divisie, the first tier of Surinamese football.

Achievements
Lidbondentoernooi: 1
Winners: 2011

References

External links
 ACoconut at SVB.sr

ACoconut FC
Brokopondo District